Michael or Mike Freeman may refer to:

Michael Freeman (surgeon) (1931–2017), British orthopaedic surgeon
Mike Freeman (bobsleigh) (1937–2007), British Olympic bobsledder
Mike Freeman (defensive back) (born 1943), American football defensive back
Michael Freeman (photographer) (born 1945), British photographer and author
Michael J. Freeman (born 1947), American inventor
Michael O. Freeman (born 1948), Minnesota attorney and politician
Mike Freeman (jazz musician) (born 1959), American vibraphonist and composer
Michael Freeman (chess player) (born 1960), New Zealand chess player
Mike Freeman (guard) (born 1961), American football player
Mike Freeman (columnist), American sports columnist
Mike Freeman (baseball) (born 1987), American baseball player

See also
Michael Freedman (disambiguation)
Michael Friedman (disambiguation)